When King Kalākaua began his reign on February 12, 1874, the monarch was constitutionally empowered to appoint and remove the Kingdom of Hawaii cabinet ministers. The four cabinet positions were Attorney General, Ministrer of Finance, Minister of Foreign Affairs and Minister of the Interior. The royal cabinet ministers were also ex-officio members of the House of Nobles in the legislature and the Privy Council of State, a larger body of advisors.

The 1875 Reciprocity Treaty with the United States eliminated tariffs on the kingdom's sugar exports, bringing an accelerated upswing in the Hawaii's economic prosperity. The criteria for appointment to the cabinet changed from being qualified to advise the head of state, to being willing to enable the monarch's chosen course of state. Kalākaua and Legislative Assembly Finance Chair Walter Murray Gibson responded with reckless spending and grandiose schemes.

Frustrated by his cabinet, the king dismissed them all on August 14, 1880. Samuel Gardner Wilder was replaced by John E. Bush as Minister of the Interior. Attorney General Edward Preston was replaced by W. Claude Jones. Minister of Finance Simon Kaloa Kaʻai was replaced by Moses Kuaea. Celso Caesar Moreno was denied recognition by the diplomatic corps stationed in Hawaii when he replaced Minister of Foreign Affairs John Mākini Kapena. Moreno resigned on August 18.

Gibson was appointed to the cabinet in 1882, and would eventually become its Prime Minister. Concerns were addressed in a written statement from businessmen to Kalākaua, "... the course of Your Majesty's present Ministry is not conducive to the public interest, nor the interest of Your Majesty ..." They accused the Ministry of influence peddling in elections and manipulation of legislative governance. The warning was brushed off by Gibson, with no response from Kalākaua. The Gibson cabinet dissolved July 1, 1887, ushering in the so-called Reform Cabinet. The Committee of Thirteen business men drafted what became known as the Bayonet Constitution, codifying the legislature as the supreme authority over actions by the monarch. Kalākaua was given no alternative but to sign the document on July 6.

The Reform Cabinet eventually fell to internal discord, replaced with a new cabinet on June 17, 1890, consisting of Attorney General Arthur P. Peterson, Finance Minister Godfrey Brown, Foreign Affairs Minister John Adams Cummins, and Interior Minister Charles Nichols Spencer. When Kalākaua died on January 20, 1891, Peterson, Brown and Cummins were held over until Queen regnant Liliʻuokalani replaced them on February 25. Spencer remained in her cabinet until September 12, 1892, when he was replaced by Charles T. Gulick.

Cabinet ministers 1874–1891

See also 
Cabinet of the Kingdom of Hawaii
Kalākaua's Privy Council of State
Liliʻuokalani's Cabinet Ministers
Bibliography of Kalākaua
MOS Hawaii-related articles

References

Bibliography

Further reading 

37 pages relating to the Bayonet Constitution

"A List of All the Cabinet Ministers Who Have Held Office in the Hawaiian Kingdom"

Members of Cabinet of the Hawaiian Kingdom
House of Kalākaua
Members of the Hawaiian Kingdom House of Nobles
Members of the Hawaiian Kingdom Privy Council